Rob Muffels (born 8 December 1994) is a German swimmer.

He competed in the 10 km open water event at the 2018 European Aquatics Championships, winning the bronze medal.

References

External links

1994 births
Living people
German male swimmers
German male freestyle swimmers
European Aquatics Championships medalists in swimming
World Aquatics Championships medalists in open water swimming
Male long-distance swimmers
20th-century German people
21st-century German people
People from Elmshorn
Sportspeople from Schleswig-Holstein